The 2016 UEMOA Tournament was a football tournament, that took place from 26 November to 3 December 2016.

Participants

Venues

Group stage

Group A

Group B

Final

References 

2016 in African football
2016
International association football competitions hosted by Togo
2016 in Togolese sport